"Hard Dirt" is a song recorded by Canadian country group Hunter Brothers. The song was written by Hunter Hayes, Steve Moakler and Eric Paslay, while Hayes produced the track. It was the lead single off their third studio album Been a Minute.

Background
Ty Hunter of the Hunter Brothers described "Hard Dirt" as a "a song that speaks to the process of enduring struggle, but also knowing that hope exists on the other side of whatever circumstances you may be going through". The band dedicated the song to frontline workers and all those affected by the COVID-19 pandemic.

Critical reception
Dutch Bickell of Canadian Beats Media said the song "serves as a message of hope and signifies our collective ability to grow through challenges and adversity". Front Porch Music stated that the track "really grabs your heart strings right away and pulls you close," adding that it is "an emotional feel good song that doesn’t disappoint our ears".

Music video
The official music video was for "Hard Dirt" premiered on July 16, 2020,  and was directed by Sean K. Smith.

Track listings
Digital download – single
 "Hard Dirt" – 2:57

Digital download – single
 "Hard Dirt" (string version) – 3:00

Charts
"Hard Dirt" reached a peak of number 17 on the Billboard Canada Country chart dated October 10, 2020, becoming the group's seventh Top 20 hit.

References

2020 songs
2020 singles
Hunter Brothers songs
Open Road Recordings singles
Songs written by Hunter Hayes
Songs written by Steve Moakler
Songs written by Eric Paslay